Léon Tallon (28 January 1908 – 11 July 1980) was a French swimmer. He competed in the men's 200 metre breaststroke event at the 1928 Summer Olympics.

References

External links
 

1908 births
1980 deaths
Olympic swimmers of France
Swimmers at the 1928 Summer Olympics
French male breaststroke swimmers